The Wien is a river that flows through Austria's capital Vienna.

Geography
Its source lies in the western Vienna Woods near Rekawinkel and its mouth at the eastern end of the city centre of Vienna, next to the Urania, where it flows into the Donaukanal ("Danube Canal"), a branch of the Danube.

The Wien is subject to huge variations in flow. In its headwaters in the Vienna Woods, the soil is underlain by sandstone. Because of this, during heavy rain the soil quickly saturates, resulting in substantial runoff.

The Wien River and the city of Vienna
Within the city limits, the river bed consists almost entirely of concrete, which was installed between 1895 and 1899 in order to stop the devastating floods, sometimes accompanied by cholera, which the river had regularly caused before that time. At the same time, the Stadtbahn ("city railway") was built, which makes use of the concrete river bed and is only separated from the river by a wall. It is now part of the Vienna U-Bahn system.

Along the course of the river, the Naschmarkt and the Theater an der Wien can be found. Much of the river is covered over in the city, particularly in front of Schönbrunn Palace, in the Meidling and Naschmarkt neighbourhoods and around Karlsplatz near the city centre.

The River Gate was built in the years 1903 to 1906 and was opened to the general public on 15 November 1906. The gate forms one of the most beautiful Jugendstil scenes to be found in the city of Vienna.

In 2013, the City of Vienna approved plans to build three terraces along the river valley. The first terrace is expected to be completed by 2015.

Cycling and walking beside The Wien

For safety reasons, cycling or walking in the concrete bed of the Wien is officially prohibited. A continually controversial topic is whether to build cycle paths and footpaths next to the water. Proponents believe the water flow can be safely regulated, while opponents do not believe this is possible. In 2005, a short segment was opened to the public, near Hütteldorf railway station. It features an audible and visual alarm system to warn users to leave the path if flooding is imminent. Extensions to this path have been proposed, but continue to receive much opposition. The path is open from March to October.

Nomenclature
In German, the river is colloquially called the "Wienfluss". Since English uses the name "Vienna" for what in German is called "Wien", in English the river is sometimes called the "Vienna River".

Picture gallery

References

Rivers of Vienna
Tributaries of the Danube
Wien-Umgebung District
Hietzing
Meidling
Margareten
Mariahilf
Wieden
Landstraße
Innere Stadt
Rivers of Austria